The People That Time Forgot is a 1977 British-American Technicolor adventure fantasy film based on the novel The People That Time Forgot (1918) and Out of Time's Abyss (1918) by Edgar Rice Burroughs. It was produced by Britain's Amicus Productions and directed by Kevin Connor. Like Connor's other two Burroughs-derived films, The Land That Time Forgot and At the Earth's Core, the film was distributed in the United States by American International Pictures.

The film is a direct sequel to The Land That Time Forgot, which initiated the series in 1975. The story follows a rescue expedition, led by Patrick Wayne in search of his friend, played by Doug McClure, who had vanished many years before. The expedition lands on Caprona, the same fantastic prehistoric land where dinosaurs and barbarian tribes of men co-exist.

Plot
Major Ben McBride (Patrick Wayne) organises a mission to the Antarctic wastes to search for his friend Bowen Tyler (Doug McClure) who has been missing in the region for several years. A British naval survey ship takes them to Caprona. McBride's party: the paleontologist Norfolk (Thorley Walters), gunner and mechanic Hogan (Shane Rimmer) and photographer Lady Charlotte 'Charlie' Cunningham (Sarah Douglas) fly over the mountain wall of Caprona in an amphibious aircraft, but are attacked by a fierce giant pterodactylus and forced down.

They find themselves in a world populated by primitive warriors and prehistoric creatures, all of whom they must evade in order to get back safely to their ship. They meet a cave-girl, Ajor (Dana Gillespie), who can speak English (she was taught by Tyler); she leads them to the land of a race of samurai-like warriors called the Nargas, who are keeping Tyler prisoner. When the volcano that the Nargas worship erupts, they must escape the cataclysm engulfing the land. Tyler sacrifices himself to cover their retreat.

Cast
 Patrick Wayne as Ben McBride 
 Doug McClure as Bowen Tyler 
 Sarah Douglas as Lady Charlotte "Charly" Cunningham 
 Dana Gillespie as Ajor 
 Thorley Walters as Norfolk 
 Shane Rimmer as Hogan 
 Tony Britton as Captain Lawton 
 John Hallam as Chung-Sha 
 David Prowse as Executioner 
 Milton Reid as Sabbala 
 Kiran Shah as Bolum 
 Richard LeParmentier as Lieutenant Whitby

Production
According to Kevin Connor, Amicus Productions wanted to follow At the Earth's Core with an adaptation of the John Carter of Mars stories, but could not afford the rights, so they made this sequel instead.

Although the film was made by Amicus Productions, the company folded before it was released, meaning AIP took sole credit.

Changes
The film makes some notable changes from the book:
 The MC flys into Caspak alone in the book, whereas he has 3 companions in the movie
 The lost world is a "polar continent" rather than the interior of a polar island.
 Bowen dies in the film and Lisa (Lys in the novels) is already dead during the events of the film, while they both survive in the novel.
 In the book, the ship's crew scale the mountains to come to the rescue.
 The book ends with two marriages; the film, none.

Prehistoric creatures
 Brontosaurus (Poster only)
 Ceratosaurus
 Dinilysia (Portrayed by a Burmese python)
 Gigantophis
 Inostrancevia Neanderthal Pterodactylus Scutosaurus Smilodon (Poster only, see above image)
 Stegosaurus Styracosaurus (Poster only)
 Triceratops (Poster only)

Critical receptionTime Out commented: "A lame sequel to Connor's earlier Edgar Rice Burroughs adaptation, The Land That Time Forgot, which was at least occasionally lively"; the Radio Times called it an "OK sequel," but a "constipated confection" with "ludicrous mechanised dinosaurs and hopeless acting from an interesting cast." The reviewer however, found that "A few shots, composed around celebrated fantasy illustrations, compensate for all the film's shortcomings"; and critic Derek Winnert similarly opined "the monsters and special effects are below par," but "there are effective moments, and there is some curiosity value in seeing singer Dana Gillespie playing Ajor"; while Blu-ray.com'' thought the film "may not be the most polished effort around, but there's fun to be had with its crazy dino encounters."

References

External links
 
 
 
 
 Eccentric Cinema – Review

1977 films
1970s fantasy adventure films
British fantasy adventure films
British sequel films
1970s English-language films
American International Pictures films
Amicus Productions films
Caspak trilogy
Films about dinosaurs
Films based on American novels
Films based on fantasy novels
Films based on science fiction novels
Films based on works by Edgar Rice Burroughs
Films directed by Kevin Connor
Films scored by John Scott (composer)
Films shot at Pinewood Studios
Films shot in the Canary Islands
Lost world films
Films about cavemen
1970s British films